Paratorna cuprescens is a species of moth of the family Tortricidae. It is found in the Russian Far East, Korea and Japan.

The wingspan is 15–17 mm.

References

Moths described in 1965
Tortricini
Moths of Asia